The Serbia and Montenegro Men's National Under-18 Ice Hockey team was the men's national under-18 ice hockey team in Serbia and Montenegro. When Serbia and Montenegro split in 2006, it became the Serbia's Men's National Under-18 Ice Hockey team.

International competitions

IIHF World U18 Championships

1999: 8th in Division I Europe
2000: 3rd in Division II Europe
2001: 7th in Division III
2002: 2nd in Division III
2003: 4th in Division II Group B
2004: 5th in Division II Group B
2005: 5th in Division II Group A
2006: 5th in Division II Group A

References

National under-18 ice hockey teams
Former national ice hockey teams
I